The Comeback Tour was a concert tour in Asia by Chinese diva Faye Wong, marking her return to public performance after several years of concentrating on her family.

Background 

She began her return in February 2010, performing at the CCTV New Year's Gala watched by over 700 million people, covering Li Jian's ballad "Legend". Later in July 2010, she first announced a series of comeback concerts starting from 29 October 2010 onwards, namely 5 in Beijing and another 5 in Shanghai. To satisfy huge overseas market demand, she declared to have more concerts in other cities of Mainland China, Taipei in Taiwan, Hong Kong, Malaysia and also Singapore.

Despite her lengthy absence, interest in the concert tickets was overwhelming: in Mainland China tickets worth nearly 200 million yuan (US$29 million) were taken up in just 10 days while in Taiwan the computerized ticketing system crashed due to excessive traffic, and 90 percent of the tickets were sold within two hours after it was restored. The story repeated itself in Hong Kong, with 93% of the tickets gone in one morning and 2 ticketing phone lines added to the 3 existing one, to catch up with the huge demand.

Venue 

The theme of the concert tour was Four Seasons and Reborn. It was held across many cities throughout the years from October 2010 to June 2012.

Setlist 
Faye performed 23 songs for all the concerts except Hong Kong and Zhengzhou, where she performed 24 tracks.
The intro music of this concert tour was partly extracted from a song called "Vainly Like Dreams (浮华若梦)", which is performed by Kubert Leung, who is also the music director of the tour.
The music of the interludes were re-composed and partly extracted from a few Faye's songs, namely "Heart Sutra (心经)", "Dream Lover (梦中人)", "The Cambrian Age (寒武纪)" and "Flower of Paradise (彼岸花)".
The song "Heart Sutra" was not performed live by Faye but rather played as the background music to end the concert. However, this was not done for the first 5 concerts held in Beijing. In fact it was only started since the Shanghai concert, with the original intention of giving condolences to the casualties in the fire accident on 15 November 2010. But, there was an exception to this for the last two concerts held in Zhengzhou, where Faye performed "Heart Sutra" live after the usual ending song "Flower of Paradise".
The table below only lists down the songs performed live by Faye for all the 46 concerts, excluding the interlude music and songs mentioned previously. The symbol * serves as the key to note the first appearance of the said song in this concert tour.

59 tracks from her own recordings had been performed throughout the tour. Those songs in bold are fixed and performed by Faye for all the concerts held under Comeback Tour 2010–2012.

Besides, she also covered the following songs which were spread across different shows:

References

Comeback Tour
2010 concert tours
2011 concert tours
2012 concert tours
Concert tours of Asia